Kallur Yadahalli is a small railway station on Mysore-Arasikere line of Indian railways.

Location
Kallur Yadahalli is located between Mysore and Hassan.

References

Villages in Mysore district